KDMA (1460 AM) is an American radio station licensed to serve the community of Montevideo, Minnesota, on the frequency of 1460 kHz.  The station is a traditional "full service" AM radio station, meaning the programming is locally produced and has a local focus.

Iowa City Broadcasting Company acquired the station in 1997 from Eagle Broadcasting Corporation. According to FCC ownership reports  Iowa City Broadcasting is 100% owned by Thomas E. Ingstad of Minnetonka, Minnesota.

External links

Radio stations in Minnesota
Country radio stations in the United States
Radio stations established in 1951
1951 establishments in Minnesota
Montevideo, Minnesota